Constance Radcliffe  (1921 – 6 January 2004) was a Manx historian who wrote primarily about the history of the parish of Maughold and the town of Ramsey, both in the north of the Isle of Man. In 1989 Radcliffe was awarded the Reih Bleeaney Vanannan in recognition of her contribution to Manx culture, and was a recipient of the MBE in 1996.

Early years
Radcliffe was born and raised in Ramsey, the only child of coal merchant Alex Curphey of Ballajora and his wife. Her father was also keenly interested in local history and the Anglo-Manx dialect, and was considered "an authority on old Ramsey".

Radcliffe received her secondary education at Ramsey Grammar school, before moving to England to study at the University of Liverpool.

Radcliffe spent much of her professional life in education, teaching in the north of England, before returning to the Isle of Man and working at the Buchan School and at Ramsey Grammar School where she taught Latin and history.

She married Manx language scholar and activist Bill Radcliffe in Kirk Maughold parish church on 15 August 1957.

Work as a historian
Radcliffe was extensively on the history of the town of Ramsey and the surrounding parishes, writing the authoritative histories on the area. She was heavily involved in historical research of Manx history and was president of the Isle of Man Natural History and Antiquarian Society and a Trustee of Manx National Heritage along with her husband Bill.

After her husband's retirement, they focused on writing and co-wrote Maughold and Ramsey Place-Names, A History of Kirk Maughold, and Kirk Bride: A Miscellany together. Following her husband's death, Radcliffe concentrated on researching the history of Ramsey. Her books Ramsey 1600–1800 and Shining by the Sea: A History of Ramsey 1800–1914 are considered the authoritative accounts of the town.

Radcliffe also did significant genealogical work on several Manx families, often helping visitors to the Island who wanted to research their connections to the Isle of Man.

In 1997 Radcliffe published Captains of the Parish: A History of this Ancient Manx Appointment which discussed the history of the office of the Captain of the Parish, which is a ceremonial local government position that dates back to the Viking settlement of the Isle of Man.

Anglo-Manx dialect
Like her father, Radcliffe was interested in the dialect of English spoken on the Isle of Man, that was heavily influenced by the Manx language. In 1986 she made cassette recordings of Manx dialect poets and authors Josephine Kermode (better known by her pen name "Cushag"), T. E. Brown, Juan Noa, Hilda Cowin, and personal friend Kathleen Faragher. All were associated with Ramsey other than T.E. Brown. Apart from writing in the distinctive Anglo-Manx dialect, the authors also described a "Manx way of life which has only just disappeared".

In 1993 she published Them ‘Oul Times: Poems by Cushag, which helped to reintroduce the poetry of Josephine Kermode and the Anglo-Manx dialect to a new generation. She praised Kermode's poetry, stating that:The knowledge and deep love of the Island she displayed in her verses not only brought warm praise within its shores, but caused her work to be highly valued wherever Manx emigrants retained fond recollections of their homeland.

Legacy
Radcliffe has been described by Manx cultural organisation Culture Vannin as "one of the Isle of Man's greatest ever historians". Her work on authors who wrote in the dialect of English spoken on the Isle of Man helped to preserve the features of the dialect for future generations. In 1989 Culture Vannin awarded Radcliffe the Reih Bleeaney Vanannan in recognition of her contribution to Manx culture and in 1996 she was a recipient of the MBE for her lifetime of contributions to the Isle of Man.

Major published works
 1978 – Maughold and Ramsey Place-Names
 1979 – A History of Kirk Maughold
 1982 – Kirk Bride: A Miscellany
 1986 – Ramsey 1600–1800
 1989 – Shining by the Sea: A History of Ramsey 1800–1914
 1993 – Them ‘Oul Times: Poems by Cushag
 1997 – Captains of the Parish: A History of this Ancient Manx Appointment

References

External links
Recordings of Constance Radcliffe reading Manx dialect poems on SoundCloud

1921 births
2004 deaths
20th-century Manx writers
Manx women writers
Manx educators